Sandefjord Bay can refer to:

Sandefjord Bay (Coronation Island), on the west side of Coronation Island
Sandefjord Cove, on Peter I Island
Sandefjord Ice Bay, on Princess Elizabeth Land, Antarctica